Emilie & Ogden is the former stage name of Canadian musician Emilie Kahn. In 2019, Kahn ceased performing under the name Emilie & Ogden and began performing as Emilie Kahn.

Early life 
Kahn was born and raised in Montreal, Quebec. She began writing songs on the piano and guitar at age 14. Kahn originally played the flute and enrolled in CÉGEP to study classical music. After seeing a harpist, Sarah Pagé, accompanying the choir she was performing with at Vanier College, she began taking private harp lessons.

Career 
Kahn's Lyon & Healy-made lever harp is from the Ogden range, hence the name Emilie & Ogden.

Emilie & Ogden released a mini-album in 2013. In June 2015, Emilie & Ogden was signed to Secret City Records. In July 2015, their stripped-down harp cover of Taylor Swift's "Style" went viral. The video of the cover was re-tweeted by Swift herself and garnered over 300,000 views. Secret City released Emilie & Ogden's debut record, 10,000, later that year. 

In 2019, Khan began releasing music as Emilie Khan.

Discography 

 10,000 (2015)
 Outro (2019 - as Emilie Kahn)

References 

Canadian women singer-songwriters
Canadian indie pop musicians
Canadian folk musicians
Canadian harpists
Living people
Singers from Montreal
Vanier College alumni
21st-century Canadian women singers
Year of birth missing (living people)